Clyde FastLink is a proposed high frequency bus rapid transit system in Glasgow, Scotland. It is planned to run between Glasgow city centre and several local and regional destinations, including Glasgow Harbour, the Scottish Exhibition and Conference Centre and Renfrew. The scheme is being led by Strathclyde Partnership for Transport (SPT) and Glasgow City Council. The route will be almost fully segregated from normal traffic, except for a small area around Broomielaw due to land constraints, and around Glasgow Central station.

Route

Fastlink's route is still being determined, but current proposals envision 'north bank' and 'south bank' routes, which will generally run on routes segregated from normal traffic. Both routes will share right of way with local traffic in a one-way loop around a terminus near Glasgow Central railway station

From the city centre hub, the 'north bank' route is planned to follow the north bank of the River Clyde in a westerly direction, serving the International Financial Services District, the Scottish Exhibition and Conference Centre and the Riverside Museum.

The 'south bank' route will follow the same route from Glasgow Central station to Finnieston, before crossing the Clyde Arc bridge to connect destinations south of the River Clyde, including Pacific Quay, Govan, the South Glasgow University Hospital and Renfrew.

Additional proposals have been made to create an easterly line to serve the 2014 Commonwealth Games venues and stadiums.

History
The first phase of the original scheme, running from Glasgow Central station to Glasgow Harbour, was given planning approval by Glasgow City Council in July 2006. It was intended to be an interim measure before the introduction of light rail sometime after 2010. The scheme was originally expected to be completed in 2010 and to cost £42 million.

However, Glasgow City Council's request for funding from the Scottish Government was rejected as part of the government's Strategic Transport Projects Review, citing its lack of regional impact, its failure to tackle congestion around Glasgow Central station and its lack of clear impact on emissions reductions. Instead, the Government promised to investigate the construction of a wider light rail network across Glasgow, and new city centre stations to resolve city-centre connectivity issues.

Current status

Fastlink is currently in review, in light of the Scottish Government's rejection of the original plan. However, funding now seems more certain given its inclusion in the Scottish Government's 2010 Draft Budget.

In January 2010 SPT adopted the 'Vision for Fastlink', which includes plans for a 'south' phase taking in both the prior link to the SECC and a spur south of the river via the Clyde Arc, serving the new South Glasgow Hospital and extending as far as Renfrew. It also contained significant new proposals for two easterly extensions to serve the 2014 Commonwealth Games village and venues.

This document is intended to guide progress of the scheme in light of other developments, such as ongoing proposals for a light rail system.

See also
 List of guided busways and BRT systems in the United Kingdom

References

External links
Clyde Fastlink on Glasgow City Council
Clyde Fastlink on Clyde Waterfront

Transport in Glasgow
Guided busways and BRT systems in the United Kingdom
Proposed public transport in the United Kingdom